Ferry Dedovich (born 17 June 1947) is an Austrian figure skater. He competed in the pairs event at the 1964 Winter Olympics.

References

External links
 

1947 births
Living people
Austrian male pair skaters
Olympic figure skaters of Austria
Figure skaters at the 1964 Winter Olympics
Figure skaters from Vienna